The black-and-yellow tanager (Chrysothlypis chrysomelas) is a fairly small passerine bird. This tanager is an endemic resident in the hills of Costa Rica and Panama.

Taxonomy and systematics 
Most authorities recognize two subspecies: The nominate in Costa Rica and western Panama and C. c. ocularis in eastern Panama, but some recognize the population in Costa Rican and extreme western Panama as a third subspecies, C. c. titanota (then limiting the nominate to the remaining part of western Panama). Some taxonomic lists modified the original name based on gender and use the specific name of chrysomelaena and this emendation is not considered correct.

Description 
The adult male has a bright yellow head, rump and underparts, and a black back, wings and tail. The wing linings are white. The male of C. c. ocularis differs in having a black spot on the lores. The female has olive upperparts and yellow underparts, but in Costa Rica and extreme western Panama (the sometimes recognized C. c. titanota) the throat and lower belly is whitish. She could be mistaken for a warbler or a female yellow-backed tanager. Immatures resemble the adult female.

Vocalizations 
The black-and-yellow tanager's call is a scratchy single or repeated  tsew, higher and faster than that of the silver-throated tanager.

Distribution 
In Panama it has been recorded as far east as the border-region with Colombia, but it has not yet been recorded in the latter country, though it almost certainly occurs. The preferred habitat is the canopy of wet forest and tall second growth, but it will feed lower at woodland edges and clearing.

Behavior and ecology 
Black-and-yellow tanagers occur in small groups, or as part of a mixed-species feeding flock. This species feeds on small  fruit, usually swallowed whole, insects and spiders.

The neat cup nest is built on a tree branch. The eggs are undescribed.

References

black-and-yellow tanager
Birds of Costa Rica
Birds of Panama
black-and-yellow tanager
black-and-yellow tanager
black-and-yellow tanager